Olio is an album by the Prestige All Stars nominally led by trumpeter Thad Jones recorded in 1957 and released on the Prestige label.

Reception

Allmusic reviewer Scott Yanow stated: "Although this was not a regular group and there is not an obvious leader, the music is on a higher level than that of a routine jam session. The challenging material and the high quality playing of the young greats makes this fairly obscure modern mainstream set well worth exploring".

Track listing 
All compositions by Teddy Charles except as indicated
"Potpourri" (Mal Waldron) - 6:04
"Blues Without Woe" - 7:58
"Touché" (Waldron) - 6:25
"Dakar" - 6:58
"Embraceable You" (George Gershwin, Ira Gershwin) - 4:17
"Hello Frisco" - 6:23

Personnel 
Thad Jones - trumpet
Frank Wess - flute, tenor saxophone
Mal Waldron - piano
Teddy Charles - vibraphone
Doug Watkins - bass
Elvin Jones - drums

Production
Teddy Charles  - supervisor
Rudy Van Gelder - engineer

References 

Thad Jones albums
1957 albums
Prestige Records albums
Albums recorded at Van Gelder Studio